Kelby is a hamlet in the North Kesteven district of Lincolnshire, England. The hamlet forms part of the civil parish of Culverthorpe and Kelby.

Kelby church is dedicated to St Andrew and was previously a chapelry of Heydour ecclesiastical parish. Its tower was rebuilt in 1881  after a collapse. The church basement is Norman and the font Early English, with pews originally from the chapel at  nearby Grade II listed Culverthorpe Hall.

A chapel for Primitive Methodists was established in 1859.

References

Hamlets in Lincolnshire
Former civil parishes in Lincolnshire
North Kesteven District